is a stop on the Setagaya Line by Tokyu Corporation and is located in Segataya, Tokyo, Japan.

Station layout
There are two side platforms on two tracks.

History

The station opened on May 1, 1925, as 
and was renamed to the present name on October 16, 1939.

References

Tokyu Setagaya Line
Stations of Tokyu Corporation
Railway stations in Tokyo